The 2007–08 Australian Figure Skating Championships was held in Warners Bay from 17 July through 25 August 2007. Skaters competed in the disciplines of men's singles, ladies' singles, ice dancing, and synchronized skating across many levels, including senior, junior, novice, adult, and the pre-novice disciplines of primary and intermediate.

Senior results

Men

Ladies

Ice dancing

Synchronized

External links
 2007–08 Australian Figure Skating Championships results

2007 in figure skating
2008 in figure skating
Fig
Fig
Australian Figure Skating Championships